Dhandayuthapani is a 2007 Indian Tamil language action film directed by Saravana Sakthi. The film stars newcomers S. Suresh Raja and Shivani Sri, with Manoj K. Jayan, Bobby, Soori, Kadhal Sukumar, Ranjitha, Viji Ketti, Balu Anand, and Mahanadhi Shankar playing supporting roles. The film, produced by C. N. Rajadurai, released on 27 April 2007.

Plot

Dhandayuthapani (S. Suresh Raja) is a carefree and jobless graduate who lives with his widowed mother and siblings in Madurai. One day, he falls in love at first sight with the college student Thenmozhi (Shivani Sri) in a temple. Dhandayuthapani then bumps into Thenmozhi in different situations, and they slowly fall in love with each other, but the lovers do not exchange a single word in all their interactions. Meanwhile, Thamizharasu (Manoj K. Jayan) and Yaanai Kumar (Bobby), two rival gangsters, are fighting over the lands belonging to the government. Later, Yaanai Kumar's henchmen plan to murder Thamizharasu. but before, they spy, Thenmozhi taking a bath in her house. Dhandayuthapani, who notices it, starts to chase them and beats them up in front of Thamizharasu.

Impressed by Dhandayuthapani's braveness, Thamizharasu offers him to join his gang, but Dhandayuthapani refuses. The cunning Thamizharasu then sends his henchmen, and they brutally attack Dhandayuthapani and lie to him that they are Yaanai Kumar's henchman. Left half-tonsured, naked, and wounded, Dhandayuthapani manages to survive the assault. His family and his friends, who fear for his life, advise him to leave the town. However, the incident leads to a drastic change in Dhandayuthapani's behaviour, and a vengeful Dhandayuthapani joins Thamizharasu's gang. Dhandayuthapani slowly becomes Thamizharasu's best henchman, and he shows his loyalty by killing Yaanai Kumar. Dhandayuthapani, who knew from the beginning that Thamizharasu was the culprit, kills him as well. The film ends with Thenmozhi marrying another man and a rowdy killing Dhandayuthapani.

Cast

S. Suresh Raja as Dhandayuthapani
Shivani Sri as Thenmozhi
Manoj K. Jayan as Thamizharasu
Bobby as Yaanai Kumar
Soori as Dhandayuthapani's friend
Kadhal Sukumar as Dhandayuthapani's friend
Ranjitha as Sandhya
Viji Ketti as Dhandayuthapani's mother
Balu Anand as Judge
Mahanadi Shankar as Thamizharasu's henchman
Besant Ravi as Yaanai Kumar's henchman
Sampath Ram as Yaanai Kumar's henchman
Saravana Sakthi as Vengai Pandi
Nisha in a special appearance

Production
Saravana Sakthi, an erstwhile assistant of S. A. Chandrasekhar, made his directorial debut with Dhandayuthapani under the banner of CNR Films. C. N. Rajadurai who is a doctor by profession had emerged as a producer in this film. S. Suresh Raja was cast to play the title role while Kerala-based Vidhya Mohan, credited as Shivani Sri, was chosen to play the heroine. The fight scenes had been choreographed by Jaguar Thangam, Ruthrun took in charge of cinematography, the music was composed by Sunil and E. L. Indhrajith and the editing was by B. S. Vasu and Saleem. The film was primarily shot in Nagercoil and Madurai.

Soundtrack

The film score and the soundtrack were composed by film composers Sunil and E. L. Indhrajith. The soundtrack features four tracks with lyrics written by Yosi, Tamilamuthan and Saravana Sakthi.

Reception
A reviewer wrote, "The only thing which is laudable in this movie is the bold attempt made by debutants" and added, "Heroine Shivani has performed well in a limited scope. Music by Sunil Indirajith is laudable". Malini Mannath said, "Suresh Raja may be a far cry from the typical hero-mould. But he performs his scenes with understanding, and like a seasoned actor. Shivani fits in as the coy Thenmozhi" and called it "a promising work from a debutant director".

References

2007 films
2000s Tamil-language films
Films set in Madurai
Films shot in Madurai
Films about organised crime in India
Indian gangster films
Indian crime action films
Indian crime drama films
2007 directorial debut films
2000s crime action films
2007 crime drama films